Gongniu Group (officially Gongniu Group Co., Ltd. or Bull Group Co., Ltd.), also known as Bull Group, is a Chinese civil electrical products manufacturing company co-founded by Ruan Liping and Ruan Xueping in 1995. 

Headquartered in Cixi, Zhejiang, Gongniu Group's shares began to be publicly traded on the Shanghai Stock Exchange in February 2020. 

Gongniu Group had long been regarded as a family-owned and managed company before it went public. Prior to 2017, the Ruan brothers held 100% of the company's equity as its sole shareholder.

History
Gongniu Group was co-established by Ruan Liping and Ruan Xueping in 1995 in Cixi by Ruan Liping and Ruan Xueping. 

In 2019, due to the alleged infringement of patent rights, Gongniu Group was sued by Jiangsu Tongling Technology, with a claim of 1 billion yuan.

On February 6, 2020, it officially landed on the SSE, with an issue price of 59.45 yuan, issuing 60 million shares and raising 3.567 billion yuan.

In May 2021, Gongniu Group was subject to an anti-monopoly investigation for allegedly entering into and implementing a monopoly agreement with the trading counterpart, and on September 27, the investigation results were released and the company was fined 295 million yuan.

In July 2021, Gongniu Group's flagship stores were accused of false propaganda. On December 12, a power strip produced by the company spontaneously combusted.

In January 2022, a socket made by the Gongniu Group exploded after about a month of usage.

References

External links
 Official Website

Electronics companies established in 1995
Home appliance manufacturers of China
Companies based in Ningbo
Home appliance brands
Chinese companies established in 1995
Companies listed on the Shanghai Stock Exchange